The Jewish News is a free weekly newspaper, established in 1997, that serves the Jewish communities of Greater London – specifically Middlesex, Hertfordshire and Essex. In 2002, it won the Press Gazette free newspaper of the year.

In February 2020, it announced plans to merge with The Jewish Chronicle. In April 2020, it announced that it would enter voluntary liquidation, alongside The Jewish Chronicle, preparatory to a combined rescue plan, but following a bid emerging for The Jewish Chronicle, announced that it would continue as an independent publication.

In November 2020, the newspaper was donated to a new charitable foundation, the Independent Jewish Community News Foundation.

Operations
The Jewish News is published in tabloid format and distributed free of charge. Published every Thursday, the paper provides a weekly mix of local, national and international Jewish news, opinions, features, sport and entertainment. It is owned by property investor, Leo Noe.

With a weekly distribution of 24,518 copies as audited by ABC for the period July to December 2016, the paper is the largest Jewish Newspaper in the UK by distribution. It is available at more than 230 points across the capital including synagogues, shops, schools, community centres and street stands, and  it had reached its 1,100th edition. It is currently under the editorship of former Daily Mail journalist and The Jewish Advocate editor Richard Ferrer.

In February 2020 the Jewish News and Jewish Chronicle announced plans to merge, subject to raising the necessary finance to support the merger. Combined, they print more than 40,000 copies weekly.

In April 2020, The Jewish Chronicle and Jewish News announced simultaneously a creditors voluntary liquidation, citing the impact of the coronavirus epidemic. The owners of The Jewish Chronicle then submitted a bid to the liquidators for its assets, intending to combine them with the Jewish News under the latter's editor. However, following the emergence of a rival bid for The Jewish Chronicle, The Jewish News announced that it had sufficient funds to operate as a going concern and would continue to be published.

In November 2020, the newspaper was donated to a new charitable foundation, the Independent Jewish Community News Foundation. It was claimed by the Jewish News that the move “will see a seamless continuation of the editorial direction under the leadership of editor Richard Ferrer and news editor Justin Cohen, who also serve as co-publishers.”

Controversies
In February 2018, Jewish News lost a libel case brought by Baroness Warsi over allegations that she has sought to excuse the actions of Islamic State terrorists. The article, written by Richard Kemp, also claimed she had objected to action being taken against British Muslims who murder and rape for the group, which Warsi said was “untrue and offensive”. Jewish News accepted that the article was false: it apologised and was ordered to pay damages of £20,000 and legal costs.

Israel policy conference 
In June 2015, Jewish News organised its inaugural UK-Israel Shared Strategic Challenges Conference. Through a series of panels and keynote addresses, the day-long event in Parliament explored issues relating to Israeli politics and the "two-state solution", responses to the rise of ISIL and countering radicalisation. Politicians, journalists, government officials and representatives of the major think tanks heard speakers included then Israeli deputy prime minister Silvan Shalom, Opposition Leader Isaac Herzog, Yesh Atid leader Yair Lapid as well as UK Middle East Minister Tobias Ellwood and Charles Farr, the Home Office's counter terrorism chief.

See also
 Hamodia
 The Jewish Chronicle
 Jewish Tribune (UK)
 The Times of Israel

References

External links

Jewish newspapers published in the United Kingdom
Newspapers established in 1997
1997 establishments in England